Manchinabele is a village in Magadi taluk in Ramanagara District, 40 km away from Bangalore city. It has a population of 1098 according to 2011 census.

Manchanabele dam 
Manchanabele dam is nearby to the place, across the river Arkavathy. It is a trekking location. It provides water to Magadi town, Kayaking also conducted here. Species of Water Snakes are also visible  However, the reservoir bed is a death trap with sudden fault-lines, large boulders as well as deep slush. More than 200 people have lost their lives between 2006 and 2011. It is very dangerous to get into the waters in this reservoir even if one is a good swimmer. The dam backwaters can also be accessed via Dabbaguli village or via Magadi road where few adventure resorts are located. The Dodda Alada Mara and Savanadurga are other tourist attractions in the circuit. The dam can be reached by direct buses from K. R. Market(Route nos. 227M, 227VA, 227VC, 242VA, 242W).

Notable people 
 Siddalingaiah - popular poet and activist in Kannada, was born in the village.

References 

Villages in Bangalore Rural district